Pleasant Valley State Prison (PVSP) is a  minimum-to-maximum security state prison in Coalinga, Fresno County, California. The facility has housed convicted murderers Sirhan Sirhan, Erik Menendez, X-Raided, and Hans Reiser, among others.

History
 
The prison opened in November 1994.  On July 17, 2000, PVSP activated two substance abuse programs involving community services for inmates who have a history of substance abuse. PVSP converted one of its general population yards into a sensitive needs yard (SNY) in November 2002, and now houses approximately 900 SNY inmates on D Facility.  Then in May 2004 converted A Facility to a sensitive needs yard and houses 1000 inmates on A Facility.

As of July 31, 2022, PVSP was incarcerating people at 116.4% of its design capacity, with 2,688.

In 2005–2006, PVSP and Avenal State Prison (ASP) were particularly affected by Valley fever,  with 150 new cases from PVSP and 30 from ASP in 2005 and 514 at PVSP and 91 at ASP in 2006. In 2007 Valley fever had killed at least four PVSP inmates and one staff member over the previous two years.

Programs
Prison Industry Authority (PIA): None
Vocational:  Air conditioning and refrigeration, auto body, auto detail, auto mechanics, auto paint, building maintenance, carpentry, computer repair, consumer electronics, dry cleaning, drywall, electrical work, janitorial, landscape and gardening, machine shop, masonry, mill and cabinetry, office services, small engine repair, plumbing, welding.
Academic: Adult Basic Education, High School/GED, Pre-Release, English as a Second Language, Literacy Program.
Other:  Community Service Crews, Religious, Arts-in-Corrections, Computers for Schools.

Notable current and former inmates
 Anerae Brown aka X-Raided: Convicted for the murder of a woman during a home invasion robbery. He was released on September 14, 2018 on parole.
 Hans Reiser, creator of ReiserFS, was convicted with the 2006 murder of his estranged wife Nina Reiser. He was initially serving his sentence in San Quentin State Prison, then was transferred to Pleasant Valley State Prison in 2011.
 Gregory Scott Haidl, the son of former Orange County Assistant Sheriff Don Haidl, was charged with the 2002 videotaped rape and molestation of an unconscious 16-year-old girl on a pool table in a Newport Beach garage. The 2005 trial resulted in the conviction of all three defendants and was one of the highest-profile trials ever in Orange County. Haidl, Keith James Spann and Kyle Joseph Nachreiner violated her with foreign objects, and are seen laughing and joking with one another during the assault. He served part of a 6-year sentence and was released in 2008.
 Jesse Rugge: Convicted of aggravated kidnapping. Notorious for his association with Jesse James Hollywood and his involvement in the kidnapping/murder of Nick Markowitz. Released in October, 2013.
 Joe Hunt: Leader of the Billionaire Boys Club
 Mark Hatten, aka Mark "Hollywood", aka Mark Richmond Hatten: Convicted in 2003 of making criminal threats against model Anna Nicole Smith; assault and battery against her neighbor Rene Navarro of North Hollywood, California. The jury convicted Mark Richmond Hatten of two felony counts; assault by means likely to produce great bodily injury and battery. Mark "Hollywood" Hatten spent six years in prison. Hatten also claimed he was the father of Smith's daughter Dannielynn born in 2006 while he was in Pleasant Valley State prison.
 Erik Menendez
 Sirhan Sirhan
 Flesh-N-Bone (born Stanley Howse), a member of the multi-platinum rap group Bone Thugs-N-Harmony. Howse was convicted on charges of assault with a deadly weapon and probation violation on September 22, 2000. He was released in July 2008.
 Roger Kibbe
 Steven "Boston" Colver: convicted in 2011 for the 2009 murder of his girlfriend's mother, Joanne Witt
 John Timothy Earnest, the shooter at the Chabad of Poway
 Ryan Scott Blinston, a serial killer who murdered three people in 2020, was imprisoned at Pleasant Valley State Prison for burglary and car theft in 2013.

See also
 List of California state prisons

References

Further reading

External links
 Pleasant Valley State Prison official webpage
 California Department of Corrections and Rehabilitation Official website

Prisons in California
Coalinga, California
Buildings and structures in Fresno County, California
1994 establishments in California